Hemidactylus mercatorius is a species of gecko. There has been confusion between it and  Hemidactylus mabouia, making it difficult to establish the ranges of the species. While the Reptile Database gives Hemidactylus mercatorius a wide distribution in eastern Africa, the IUCN restricts its native distribution to Madagascar and some other islands in the Indian Ocean (the Comoros, Seychelles, Mayotte).

References

Hemidactylus
Reptiles described in 1842
Taxa named by John Edward Gray
Reptiles of the Comoros
Reptiles of Madagascar
Fauna of Mayotte
Fauna of Seychelles